Emi Khan (Urdu: ايمی خان), born 1 March 1997) is a singer, film director, producer and actor Emi Khan was inspired from music since childhood and used to sing in school and colleges at events and he started taking music seriously and finally entered in Indian Music Industry in the year of 2016 and made his name in very short while. Khan started his music career by stealing his first song "JANIYA" which was originally written composed and sung by Ali Xilvia Shah.

Early life 
Emi Khan was born in Mardan and doing his Higher Qualifications from Islamabad.

References

External links 
Profile at Hungama.com
 

1994 births
Pakistani male singers
Living people
Urdu-language singers